Tetranitromethane or TNM is an organic oxidizer with chemical formula . Its chemical structure consists of four nitro groups attached to one carbon atom. In 1857 it was first synthesised by the reaction of sodium cyanoacetamide with nitric acid.

Uses
It has been investigated for use as an oxidizer in bipropellant rockets; however, its high melting point makes it unsuitable. Highly purified tetranitromethane cannot be made to explode, but its sensitivity is increased dramatically by oxidizable contaminants, such as anti-freezing additives. This makes it effectively unusable as a propellant. In the laboratory it is used as a reagent for the detection of double bonds in organic compounds and as a nitrating reagent.  It has also found use as an additive to diesel fuel to increase the cetane number.

Preparation

TNM is a pale yellow liquid that can be prepared in the laboratory by the nitration of acetic anhydride with anhydrous nitric acid (Chattaway's method).  This method was attempted on an industrial scale in the 1950s by Nitroform Products Company in Newark, USA, but the entire plant was destroyed by an explosion in 1953.

The first industrial scale production was started in Germany during World War II in an effort to improve the cetane number of diesel fuel. This process improved the original method, which started with acetic acid and nitric acid. Without regard to yield or cost, approximately 10 tons of TNM were produced in a few weeks. However, this production process has not been used again industrially after the end of the war, because of high associated costs.

For commercial use a cheaper method starting from acetylene has been used.
First, nitric acid containing mercuric nitrate is reduced by acetylene, resulting in trinitromethane (nitroform) and a mixture of carbon dioxide and nitrogen oxide as waste gas.  The nitrogen oxides are valuable and normally recovered as nitric acid in an absorption tower.  The resulting nitroform is converted to TNM by adding nitric and sulfuric acid at higher temperatures. With this method a yield of 90% (based on nitric acid) before purification can be reached.

Structure

TNM is a prime example of molecular flexibility. It brought structural methods to the limits of their applicability as is shown by the fact that the structure of TNM was attempted to be determined for a period of more than 70 years in various phases. 

Early investigations by gas electron diffractions were unable to describe the observed diffraction pattern in full and only the application of a four-dimensional model concerning the correlated movement of the four  groups about the C–N bonds was able to describe the experimental observations fully. The problem occurs, because the two-fold local symmetry of the  units versus the three-fold symmetry of the  unit, as well as the close proximity of the  groups hindering their free rotation, is the source for a very complicated mutually hindered movement of the  groups. 

The crystal structure has also been attempted several times. A first decent solution of the problem required a model describing a highly disordered high‐temperature crystalline phase of a high-temperature phase (>174.4 K) as is shown in Figure 1. Reduction of symmetry and analysis of the twinning of the crystals led finally to a resolved disorder of the structure shown in Figure 2.

The structure of an ordered low‐temperature phase contains three independent molecules in the asymmetric unit. Structural parameters of the gaseous and solid phases are listed in the following table for comparison.

Safety
The ability of TNM to detonate is greatly affected by the presence of impurities, even in small quantities. TNM forms extremely powerful explosive mixtures when fuels are added in stoichiometric proportions. Many of these mixtures show sensitivity to impact even higher than that of nitroglycerine.

Tetranitromethane can be used as a component of highly explosive liquid explosives as an oxidizing agent. It forms highly explosive mixtures with all flammable substances. When experimenting with this substance, paper filters should not be used for filtration. Even small impurities make tetranitromethane an explosive that explodes on impact or friction. A tragic lecture experiment at the University of Münster in 1920 is well known, where a small steel tube containing tetranitromethane, toluene and absorbent cotton detonated shortly before burning out in such a way that more than 30 students were injured, some seriously; however, on the basis of the rector's office records, as many as 10 deaths and more than a dozen injuries are documented. Thereupon the German Chemical-technical Reichsanstalt determined a detonation speed of 9300 meters per second. Alfred Stettbacher then proved comparatively that this mixture was far more explosive than hexogen, pentrite, blasting gelatine or panclastite and thus represented the most destructive explosive of all.

TNM reacts with moisture at elevated pH to produce trinitromethane (nitroform) which reacts easily with metals to form highly unstable and explosive salts.

Tetranitromethane is highly toxic.  Absorption of as little as 2.5 mg/kg can cause methemoglobinemia, pulmonary edema, and damage to liver, kidney, and central nervous system. It is reasonably expected to be a human carcinogen.

References

External links
WebBook page for CN4O8
CDC - NIOSH Pocket Guide to Chemical Hazards

Nitroalkanes
Liquid explosives
Explosive chemicals
Rocket oxidizers
Fuel additives
IARC Group 2B carcinogens
Inorganic carbon compounds
Pulmonary agents